The Boundaries of Hong Kong, officially the Boundary of the Administrative Division of the Hong Kong Special Administrative Region of the People’s Republic of China, is a regulated administrative border with border control in force under the One country, two systems constitutional principle, which separates the Hong Kong Special Administrative Region from mainland China, by land border fence of  and maritime boundary of , enforcing a separate immigration and customs-controlled jurisdiction from mainland China.

The boundaries of Hong Kong are patrolled and controlled by the Hong Kong Police Force and its Marine Region and the Immigration Department at land and sea. The land boundary also includes a buffer zone, known as Frontier Closed Area.

History

After the First Opium War and territorial establishment of Hong Kong, the Hong Kong Island was ceded by the Qing Empire to the United Kingdom of Great Britain and Ireland through Treaty of Nanjing in 1842, not marking any official maritime boundaries.

In 1860, the Convention of Peking extended the cession to include Kowloon with the land boundary limits until "Boundary street in Kowloon"., and in 1898 with additional land of New Territories was leased for 99-years to the British under the Convention for the Extension of Hong Kong Territory with the Sham Chun River primarily marking the boundary between British Hong Kong and Qing dynasty. 

Between the years of 1941 and 1945 during the Japanese occupation of Hong Kong, boundaries of Hong Kong may or may not have been clearly distinguished as parts of Southern China alongside Hong Kong were together occupied by the Japanese Empire. After the Japanese surrender in 1945, all British government institutions in Hong Kong, including the land boundary primarily running across the Sham Chun River were restored.

In 1984, the governments of the United Kingdom and the People's Republic of China (PRC) concluded the Sino-British Joint Declaration on the Question of Hong Kong, under which the sovereignty of the leased territories, together with Hong Kong Island and Kowloon (south of Boundary Street) ceded under the Convention of Peking (1860), was transferred to the PRC on 1 July 1997, maintaining the current land boundary primarily running across the Sham Chun River, however the Hong Kong Basic Law modified and extended the size of Hong Kong's maritime boundary with mainland China in 1997.

Historical maps

Immigration control points
As of 2021, 8 out of Hong Kong's 15 points of entry/border crossings controlled by the Immigration Department are located on or cross the land border fence. Entry and exit immigration clearance into Hong Kong by sea can be cleared at 4 Ferry terminals:, and the other 3 out of 15 immigration clearance points in Hong Kong are located at 2 railway stations and one at the Hong Kong International Airport.

See also
 Borders of China
 Frontier Closed Area

References

Border barriers
Borders of Hong Kong
Borders of China
British Hong Kong
 
Law enforcement in Hong Kong
North District, Hong Kong
Yuen Long District